Mỹ Phương is a commune (xã) and village in Ba Bể District, Bắc Kạn Province, in Vietnam. As of April 2009, the population was 3,259, which was 1.1% of Bắc Kạn's population at the time.

References 

Populated places in Bắc Kạn province
Communes of Bắc Kạn province